This is a list of sovereign states in the 2020s, giving an overview of states around the world during the period between 1 January 2020 and the present day. It contains 210 entries, arranged alphabetically, with information on the status and recognition of their sovereignty. It includes 195 widely recognized sovereign states, two associated states, and 13 entities which claim an effective sovereignty but are considered de jure constituents of other powers by the general international community.

Members or observers of the United Nations

Non-UN members or observers

Other entities
Excluded from the list above are the following noteworthy entities which either were not fully sovereign or did not claim to be independent:
  as a whole has no government and no permanent population. Seven states claim portions of Antarctica and five of these have reciprocally recognised one another's claims. These claims, which were regulated by the Antarctic Treaty System, were neither recognised nor disputed by any other signatory state.
  The European Union is a sui generis supranational organisation which had 27 (then 28) member states. The member states had transferred a measure of their legislative, executive, and judicial powers to the institutions of the EU, and as such the EU had some elements of sovereignty, without generally being considered a sovereign state. The European Union did not claim to be a sovereign state and had only limited capacity for relations with other states.
 The Islamic State of Iraq and the Levant (ISIL) is a former proto-state and current insurgent group in primarily Iraq and Syria among other nations. ISlL used to be considered a quasi-state, but is no longer considered as such.
  The Sovereign Military Order of Malta is a United Nations observer. The order had bi-lateral diplomatic relations with a large number of states, but has no territory other than extraterritorial areas within Rome and Malta. The order's Constitution stated: "The Order is a subject of international law and exercises sovereign functions." Although the order frequently asserted its sovereignty, it did not claim to be a sovereign state. It lacked a defined territory. Since all its members were citizens of other states, almost all of them lived in their native countries, and those who resided in the order's extraterritorial properties in Rome did so only in connection with their official duties, the order lacked the characteristic of having a permanent population.
 The Tigray Region is recognized as a region of Ethiopia. Despite being at war with the rest of Ethiopia, it isn't commonly considered a soveriegn state and is more of an insurgency or proto-state.

See also
List of sovereign states by year
List of state leaders in 2020
List of state leaders in 2021
List of state leaders in 2022
List of state leaders in 2023

Notes

References

2020s politics-related lists
2020-2029